The 1977–78 John Player Cup was the seventh edition of England's premier rugby union club competition at the time. Gloucester won the competition defeating Leicester in the final. The event was sponsored by John Player cigarettes and the final was held at Twickenham Stadium.

Draw and results

First round
				
Progressed as away team*

Second round

Quarter-finals

Semi-finals

Final

References

1977–78 rugby union tournaments for clubs
John Player Cup
RFU Knockout Cup